Victor Koning (4 April 1842 – 1 October 1894) was a French playwright and librettist.

Biography 
He authored theatre plays, mostly comedies and comédie en vaudeville and successful operettas libretti including La Fille de madame Angot (1872) by Charles Lecocq which he wrote in collaboration with Clairville and Paul Siraudin.

Victor Koning was also managing director of the Théâtre de la Gaîté from 1 April 1868 to 13 March 1869 and of the Théâtre de la Renaissance from 1875 to 1882.

On 19 June 1884 in Marylebone (England), he married  the actress Jane Hading, who he helped make her debut at the Théâtre du Gymnase the previous year in Le Maître de forges,  a huge theatrical and literary success. They divorced in 1888. On 27 May 1893, he married a second time with the actress Raphaële Sisos  The writers Jules Clarétie and Auguste Vacquerie, Eugène Bertrand, director of the Opéra de Paris, and Arthur Meyer, director of Le Gaulois, were witnesses at the act.

In July 1894, he suffered a stroke. Some days later, the Gil Blas informed its readers that   But his health was getting worse.

In Le Temps dated 8 September, it read that 

It is in this facility that he died three weeks later. He was buried on 4 October in the Montparnasse Cemetery.

Works

Theatre
 1867: Les Plaisirs de Paris ou 1867, revue in four acts and twenty-five tableaux by Koning, Saint-Agnan Choler and Adolphe Choler, Théâtre de la Porte-Saint-Martin
 1872: La revue n'est pas au coin du quai, review in four tableaux by Koning, Siraudin and Clairville, Théâtre des Variétés
 1872: La Cocotte aux œufs d'or, féérie in three acts and twelve tableaux by Koning, Clairville and Eugène Grangé, Théâtre des Menus-Plaisirs
 1873: La Fille de madame Angot, opéra comique in three acts by Koning, Siraudin and Clairville, music by Charles Lecocq, Théâtre des Folies-Dramatiques
 1873: Canaille et Compagnie, drama in five acts and ten tableaux by Koning, Siraudin and Clairville, Théâtre de l'Ambigu-Comique
 1876: On demande une femme honnête, comédy in one act by Koning and Aurélien Scholl, Théâtre des Variétés

Texts 
 1864: Les Coulisses parisiennes, foreword by Albéric Second, E. Dentu, Paris
 1866: Voyage autour du demi-monde, foreword by Théodore Barrière, E. Dentu, Paris
 1872: Tout Paris, foreword by Henry de Pène, E. Dentu, Paris

References 

19th-century French dramatists and playwrights
Theatre directors from Paris
French librettists
Writers from Paris
1842 births
1894 deaths
Burials at Montparnasse Cemetery